WSKB (89.5 FM) is a radio station licensed to serve Westfield State University and the Westfield, Massachusetts, area.  The station is owned by the Trustees of Westfield State University. It airs a college radio modern rock format.

The station was assigned the WSKB call letters by the Federal Communications Commission and began operations in October 1974.

References

External links
 WSKB official website

SKB
Modern rock radio stations in the United States
Mass media in Hampden County, Massachusetts
Radio stations established in 1974
Westfield State University
Westfield, Massachusetts
1974 establishments in Massachusetts